This page is a list of paintings by Nicolas Poussin (Andelys, 15 June 1594 – Rome, 19 November 1665). The attributions vary notably from one art historian to another. Jacques Thuillier, one of the most restrictive, produced a list in 1994 that gave 224 uncontested autograph works and 33 works with minor or major doubts about their attribution to Poussin. Certain attributions have since changed, when paintings thought lost are rediscovered, meaning that this list cannot be considered exhaustive.

List 
This list includes paintings whose locations have been definitely found. The numbers refer to the two last 'catalogues raisonnés' cited in the sources : Thuillier 1994 and Blunt 1966.

References

Bibliography
 
 Jacques Thuillier, Tout l'œuvre peint de Poussin : Documentation et catalogue raisonné, Paris, Rizzoli-Flammarion, Les Classique de l'Art series, 1974, 136 p.
 Jacques Thuillier, Nicolas Poussin, Paris, Flammarion, 1994, 287 p. – contains a summary of the 1974 work's catalogue
 Pierre Rosenberg, Nicolas Poussin (1594–1665), exhibition catalogue, Grand Palais, Paris, RMN, 1996

External links 
 List of paintings by Nicolas Poussin
 List of paintings by Nicolas Poussin on the Web Gallery of Art

 
Poussin